Ramadan Sokoli (14 June 1920 – 12 March 2008) was an Albanian ethnomusicologist, musician, composer and writer. He is regarded as one of the most distinguished scholars of the Albanian and Balkan music.

Ramadan Sokoli was born on June 14, 1920 in Shkodër. He graduated from the elementary and highschool of Shkodër before moving to Florence to study musicology. After World War II he created and became the head of the department of musical folklore. Sokoli is considered to be a pioneer of Albanian ethnomusicology. His work on Ottoman music modes and practices in Balkan music has been regarded as one of the most important ones on the subject.

References 

Albanian writers
1920 births
2008 deaths
Albanian folklorists
Albanian musicians
People from Shkodër
20th-century Albanian musicians
Albanian expatriates in Italy